The Congress Spelling System (Malay: Ejaan Kongres) is a spelling reform of Malay Rumi Script introduced during the third Malay Congress held in Johor Bahru and Singapore in 1956. The main characteristics of the system are the use of symbols in the International Phonetic Alphabet, going by the dictum of one symbol for one phoneme, and the new proposition in the writing of diphthongs.

The innovation was originally intended to replace the Za'aba Spelling and ultimately to become a standard orthography in the Malay speaking world, but did not seem to gain acceptance in general. It was deemed impractical for use by the masses, and certain graphemes proposed by the system were not represented in the common typewriters at that time. Even then, certain groups, particularly those affiliated to the Literary Movement 1950, used the Congress graphemes for diphthongs in their own publications.

Background
In the 1950s, two different orthographies were used in the Malay-speaking world, namely the Republican Spelling System in Indonesia and Za'aba Spelling in British Malaya and Borneo. The Za'ba Spelling System, introduced in 1933, was the improvised version of the earlier orthography introduced by the British scholar, R J Wilkinson. Similarly in Indonesia, the Republican Spelling System was introduced in 1947 to replace the older Dutch Van Ophuijsen Spelling System.

The third Malay congress held in Johor Bahru and Singapore from 16 to 21 September 1956, seek to unite these two different orthographies into a single system. The new orthography, was envisioned to be a better and practical system, which is simplified and using standardized methods of spelling, and emphasized more on the use of Malay phonology system. During the congress, two proposal papers concerning the new orthography was presented by Literary Movement 1950 and Malay Language Association of University of Malaya. Literary Movement 1950, proposed a system already in use by their writers, largely based on Fajar Asia orthography introduced during Japanese occupation in 1943. Malay Language Association of University of Malaya generally rejects the use of digraphs and vehemently promotes the Indonesian spelling elements. A consensus was reached during the congress, and the new orthography was later named Ejaan Kongres (the congress spelling'). 

In 1957, the Congress Spelling System was published for the first time by Dewan Bahasa dan Pustaka in its language leaflet, DBP bilangan (1), with the title Kaedah Baharu Ejaan Rumi Bahasa Melayu (menurut keputusan Kongres Bahasa dan Persuratan Melayu III) (Malay for 'New Methods of Rumi Spelling of Malay Language (based on the decision of Congress of Malay language and letters III)').

Reception
The Congress Spelling System did not seem to gain acceptance of people in general. The reason was that it was not practical for use by the ordinary people and certain graphemes proposed by the system were not represented in the typewriters. Even then, certain groups, particularly those affiliated to the Literary Movement 1950 used the Congress graphemes for diphthongs in their own publications. This group even reverted to the Wilkinson style of writing the vowels in closed final syllables which was, similar to the Republican style in Indonesia. 

Since the Malay sections of publishing houses were mainly manned by members of the Literary Movement 1950 or their sympathisers, the Movement's style of spelling seemed to gain a widespread currency through published works. In the meantime, the schools and the government publications were still using the Za'aba or the school system of spelling. Hence, the public became confused as to which system to follow. Language usage outside the precincts of the school reflected a state of confusion in the minds of the people in the spelling of their language using the Rumi script. It was not unusual to find several systems used in a short passage in the print media not to mention in individual writings.

The state of confusion was ended with the introduction of New Rumi Spelling in 1972, that finally united the different orthographies of the Malay-speaking world into a single system.

The system
In the third Malay Congress of 1956, a total of 16 resolutions were made for orthography, 2 resolutions for phonetics, and a resolution for Jawi alphabet. The list of letters agreed upon for the new orthography are as below.

{| class="wikitable" style="text-align:center; table-layout:fixed"
|+ Congress Spelling Rumi alphabet
|-
!Uppercase Latin alphabet
|A||B||C||D||E||F||G||H||I||J||K||L||M||N||Ŋ||Ñ||O||P||Q||R||S||Š||T||U||V||W||X||Y||Z
|-
!Lowercase Latin alphabet
|a||b||c||d||e||f||g||h||i||j||k||l||m||n||ŋ||ñ||o||p||q||r||s||š||t||u||v||w||x||y||z
|-
! IPA phonemes
|
|
|
|
| and 
|
|
|
|
|
|
|
|
|
|
|
|
|
|
|
|
|
|
|
|
|
|~ks
|
|
|}

Schwa
It differed markedly with Za'aba spelling that differentiates  and  sounds with letters  and  respectively. 

{| class="wikitable"
|-
! Za'aba spelling !! Congress spelling !! IPA !! Meaning
|-
| bĕrhemat || berhemat ||  || being prudent
|-
| mĕngganggu || meñgañgu ||  || disturb
|-
| mĕrdeka || merdeka ||  || independence
|-
| tĕntĕra || tentera ||  || soldier
|}

Choice of graphemes
The principal feature of Congress Spelling is the representation of a phoneme with a grapheme or a single letter only. Thus, it rejects the use of digraphs commonly found in the earlier orthographies.

{| class="wikitable"
|-
! Za'aba !! Congress !! IPA !! Za'aba example !! Congress example !! Meaning
|-
| ch || c ||  || chichak || cicak || gecko
|-
| ng || ŋ ||  || nganga || ŋaŋa || opening widely (for mouth or door)
|-
| ngg || ñ ||  || tunggu || tuñgu || wait
|-
| sh || š ||  || shisha || šiša || shisha
|}

Diphthongs
The Congress also made a new proposition in the writing of diphthongs.

{| class="wikitable"
|-
! Za'aba !! Congress !! IPA !! Za'aba example !! Congress example !! Meaning
|-
| au || aw ||  || kalau || kalaw || if
|-
| ai || ay ||  || tirai || tiray || curtain
|-
| oi || oy ||  || boroi || boroy || pot-belly
|}

Morphemes
A fixed rule for the choice of vowels for morphemes in disyllabic words were established in the Congress Spelling.

This Congress rule contradicts with the old Za'aba spelling that concentrate more on the native Malay phonology rather than using the existing theories and linguistic techniques.

Final syllables that end with letters k or h
{| class="wikitable"
|-
! Za'aba spelling !! Congress spelling !! Meaning
|-
| aleh || alih || to move
|-
| leteh || letih || tired
|-
| balek || balik || to return
|-
| chantek || cantik || beautiful
|-
! colspan="3"|Exceptions to words with diphthong 
|-
! Za'aba Spelling !! Congress spelling !! Meaning
|-
| naik || naik || to increase
|-
| baik || baik || good
|-
| raih || raih || to gain
|-
|}

{| class="wikitable"
|-
! Za'aba spelling !! Congress spelling !! Meaning
|-
| nasib || nasib || fate
|-
| katil || katil || bed
|-
| kutip || kutip || to pick
|-
| pasir || pasir || sand
|-
! colspan="3"|Exceptions to open syllables with vowel  and 
|-
! Za'aba spelling !! Congress spelling !! Meaning
|-
| deret || deret || row
|-
| leher || leher || neck
|-
| bogel || bogel || nude
|-
|}

Phonemes for hamza and ayin
The Congress spelling are in agreement that Rumi phonemes for both letters are similar. However, due to differing opinions among the participants, the Congress spelling did not produce any resolution on the use of both phonemes, and opened the issue for public interpretations. The congress nevertheless, proposed four resolutions concerning hamza and ayin.

1. The phonemes shall not be represented by any grapheme when it become onset of first morpheme. For example, 
{| class="wikitable"
|-
! Jawi spelling !! Za'aba spelling !! Congress spelling !! Meaning
|-
| عادل||'adil || adil || fair
|-
| عالم||'alam || alam || nature
|-
| علماء||'ulama || ulama || scholar
|-
|}

2. The phonemes shall be represented by letter  only if they become the coda of the last morpheme. Example as follows
{| class="wikitable"
|-
! Jawi spelling !! Old spelling !! Congress spelling !! Meaning
|-
| تيدق|| tida' || tidak || no
|-
| أنق|| ana' || anak || child
|-
| دودوق|| dudo' || duduk || sit 
|-
|}

3. Example as follows

{| class="wikitable"
|-
! Jawi spelling !! Congress spelling !! Alternative spelling !! Meaning
|-
| معلوم|| maklum || ma'lum || informed
|-
| موءمين|| mukmin || mu'min || believer
|-
| باءيق|| baik || ba'ik || good
|}

4. To avoid confusion, the apostrophe  can be used to represent phoneme of glottal stops only if it become onset for non-first morpheme.

The letter 
There are a total of four resolutions concerning the letter  in the Congress Spelling System.

1.
{| class="wikitable"
|-
! Congress spelling !! Alternative spelling !! Meaning
|-
| hala|| 'ala || direction
|-
| hadap|| 'adap || facing
|-
| hulu|| 'ulu || upstream
|-
| hujan|| 'ujan || rain
|-
|}

2.
{| class="wikitable"
|-
! Congress spelling !! Wrong spelling !! Meaning
|-
| bahan|| ba'an || ingredient
|-
| leher|| le'er || neck
|-
| bohoñ|| bo'oñ || to lie
|-
|}

{| class="wikitable"
|-
! Congress spelling !! Alternative spelling !! Meaning
|-
| mahu|| mau || want
|-
| jahit|| jait || to sew
|-
| tahun|| taun || year
|-
|}

3. For similar sounding words that carry different meaning, both rules of maintaining and removing  are applied to differentiate their meaning.
{| class="wikitable"
|-
! Congress spelling !! Meaning !! Congress spelling !! Meaning
|-
| tahu|| tofu || tau || to know
|-
| bahu|| shoulder || bau || smell
|-
| harus|| should || arus || current
|-
|}

4. For letter  that becomes a coda for morpheme, it must be maintained
{| class="wikitable"
|-
! Congress spelling !! Wrong spelling !! Meaning
|-
| lemah|| lema || weak
|-
| tanah|| tana || soil
|-
| boleh|| bole || can
|-
| teduh|| tedu || to shelter
|-
| rahsia|| rasia || secret
|-
| mahkota|| makota || crown
|-
|}
Exceptions are given to Malay words that derived from foreign words.

Hyphens
The use of hyphens commonly found in the old spellings, is discontinued in the Congress spelling except in three conditions; reduplication, compound words and for line breaks. Malay affixes like di-, ke-, ter-, -kan, -an, and particles like -lah, -tah, -kah, and -nya are no longer hyphenated, but combined with the words.

{| class="wikitable"
|-
! Za'aba spelling !! Congress spelling !! Meaning
|-
| bila-kah|| bilakah || when
|-
| apa-lah|| apalah || what a
|-
|}
The hyphen remains in use between components of reduplicated words, like menari-nari ('keeps on dancing') and rumah-rumah ('houses'). However, for compound words like setia-usaha ('secretary'), jawatan-kuasa ('committee'), kerja-sama ('teamwork'), exceptions are given to compound words that already firmly embedded like matahari ('sun'), purbakala ('ancient'), and tanggungjawab ('responsibility').

Adoption of Indonesian spelling
The Congress Spelling vehemently promoted the Indonesian Republican Spelling System, which in certain words, are deemed in harmony with the original pronunciation.

{| class="wikitable"
|-
! Za'aba spelling !! Congress spelling !! Meaning
|-
| ayer || air || water
|-
| kerana || karena || because
|-
| wang || uang || money
|-
| erti || arti || meaning
|-
| hairan || héran || astonish
|-
| kurnia || karunia || gift
|-
| kelmarin || kemarin || the day before yesterday
|-
| ia-itu || yaitu || namely
|-
|}

Notes

Bibliography

 
 

Malay language
Orthography reform